Copiula tyleri is a species of frog in the family Microhylidae. It is endemic to northeastern New Guinea and is found in both Western New Guinea (Cyclops Mountains) and Papua New Guinea (Bewani, Torricelli, Hunstein, and Adelbert Ranges). The specific name tyleri honours Michael J. Tyler, Australian herpetologist who have worked extensively with Australian and New Guinean frogs.

Description
Adult males measure  and females  in snout–vent length. The tympanum is conspicuous and unpigmented. The snout is relatively short and broad. Fingers and toes are without webbing. Skin is smooth. The dorsum is dark brown. There are dark post-orbital bands. The iris is dark brown, approaching black, with tiny golden flecks.

Habitat and conservation
One specimen was found hiding beneath a broad leaf on the forest floor at daytime, and once uncovered, tried to hide in a hole in the ground.

Copiula tyleri is a common species with no known major threats. It occurs in the Cyclops Mountains Nature Reserve.

References

tyleri
Amphibians of Western New Guinea
Amphibians of Papua New Guinea
Amphibians described in 1990
Taxonomy articles created by Polbot